Lents Town Center/Southeast Foster Road is a light rail station on the MAX Green Line in Portland, Oregon. It is the 5th stop southbound on the I-205 MAX branch. The station is at the intersection of Interstate 205 and Foster Road. It is located in the Lents neighborhood's town center business district. It also provides access to the Springwater Corridor, which was once a transit line to the suburbs and is now a dedicated bikeway through southeast Portland.

Bus line connections
This station is served by the following bus lines:
10 - Harold St
14 - Hawthorne
73 - 122nd Ave

References

External links
Station information (with northbound ID number) from TriMet
Station information (with southbound ID number) from TriMet
MAX Light Rail Stations – more general TriMet page

MAX Light Rail stations
MAX Green Line
Railway stations in the United States opened in 2009
2009 establishments in Oregon
Lents, Portland, Oregon
Railway stations in Portland, Oregon